The 2012 Western Kentucky Hilltoppers football team represented Western Kentucky University in the 2012 NCAA Division I FBS football season. They were led by third-year head coach Willie Taggart and played their home games at Houchens Industries–L. T. Smith Stadium. They were a member of the Sun Belt Conference. They finished the season 7–6, 4–4 in Sun Belt play to finish in fifth place. They were invited to the Little Caesars Pizza Bowl, their first bowl appearance since joining FBS in 2007, where they were defeated by Central Michigan.

After a three-year record of 16–20, head coach Willie Taggart resigned in December to become the head coach at South Florida. Defensive coordinator Lance Guidry coached the Hilltoppers in Little Caesars Pizza Bowl. Bobby Petrino was hired as the school's new head coach on December 10, 2012.

Schedule

Game summaries

Austin Peay

@ Alabama

@ Kentucky

The win over the Wildcats of the SEC marks the Hilltoppers first ever win over a team from a Bowl Championship Series conference..

Southern Miss

@ Arkansas State

@ Troy

Louisiana–Monroe

@ FIU

Middle Tennessee

Florida Atlantic

@ Louisiana–Lafayette

North Texas

Central Michigan–Little Caesars Pizza Bowl

This will be the Hilltoppers first bowl game since becoming a member of the FBS in 2007.

References

WKU
Western Kentucky Hilltoppers football seasons
Western Kentucky Hilltoppers football